George Fenner may refer to:

 George Fenner (Cambridgeshire cricketer) (1799–1871), English cricketer
 George Fenner (Kent cricketer) (1896–1971), English cricketer